Concord Park is a large park in the North of Sheffield, UK.

Concord Park may also refer to:

 Concord Park, Pennsylvania, USA
 Concord Park, South Carolina, USA
 Concord Park Place, Toronto, Canada

See also
Concord (disambiguation)